Waheed Owolabi Adekunle (born 1 January 1986) is a Nigerian professional footballer who played as a striker for United S.C. on loan from George Telegraph S.C. in the I-League.

Career

United
On 14 February 2014, Waheed signed for United S.C. on loan from George Telegraph S.C. He made his debut in the I-League on 19 February 2014 against United S.C. at the Kalyani Stadium in which he started and played till 88th minute before being replaced by Jayanta Sen as United drew the match 1-1.

Career statistics

References

1986 births
Living people
Nigerian footballers
United SC players
Association football forwards
I-League players
Nigerian expatriate sportspeople in India
Expatriate footballers in India